Petrykivka Raion was a raion (district) of Dnipropetrovsk Oblast, southeastern-central Ukraine. Its administrative center was the urban-type settlement of Petrykivka. The raion was abolished on 18 July 2020 as part of the administrative reform of Ukraine, which reduced the number of raions of Dnipropetrovsk Oblast to seven. The area of Petrykivka Raion was merged into Dnipro Raion.

The raion contains Dnyprovsko-Orylsky Nature Reserve.

At the time of disestablishment, the raion consisted of one hromada, Petrykivka settlement hromada with the administration in Petrykivka.

References

Former raions of Dnipropetrovsk Oblast
1923 establishments in Ukraine
Ukrainian raions abolished during the 2020 administrative reform